Frank J. Meluskey (July 9, 1952 – November 22, 1978) was a Democratic member of the Pennsylvania House of Representatives.
 He died in 1978, of a heart condition, congenital aortic valvular stenosis.

References

1978 deaths
Democratic Party members of the Pennsylvania House of Representatives
1952 births
20th-century American politicians